The 1930 Five Nations Championship was the sixteenth series of the rugby union Five Nations Championship following the inclusion of France into the Home Nations Championship. Including the previous Home Nations Championships, this was the forty-third series of the annual northern hemisphere rugby union championship. Ten matches were played between 1 January and 21 April. It was contested by England, France, Ireland, Scotland and Wales.

Table

Results

External links

1930
Five Nations
Five Nations
Five Nations
Five Nations
Five Nations
Five Nations